The Amityville Curse is a prequel to The Amityville Horror written by Hans Holzer and released in 1981. A film adaptation titled The Amityville Curse was released direct-to-video in 1990.

Summary
The plot is entirely  fictional, detailing how the house at 112 Ocean Ave. was once a rectory where one of the priests died, and the house subsequently becoming haunted.

Reception
The book was given mixed reviews. It confused readers with why the house was haunted. This was because Holzer's 1979 book Murder in Amityville tells a different story on why the house is haunted.

Film adaptation
A film adaptation loosely based on the book, The Amityville Curse, was released direct-to-video in 1990.

References

1981 novels
American horror novels
American novels adapted into films
The Amityville Horror